Goblin was a small town located at the mouth of Bay D'Espoir on the south coast of Newfoundland and Labrador. The origin of the name is unknown but it may come from the rugged and mysterious terrain of the area or a nearby rock feature that resembles a goblin. The bay was the location of a seasonal cod fishery in the 18th century and was permanently settled in the 19th century. The population peaked around 40 in 1911. The town was abandoned between 1951 and 1956.

See also
List of communities in Newfoundland and Labrador
List of ghost towns in Newfoundland and Labrador

References 
 Smallwood, Joseph R. Encyclopedia of Newfoundland and Labrador, Newfoundland Book Publishers Ltd., 1967, p. 544
 

Ghost towns in Newfoundland and Labrador